The following teams and players took part in the men's volleyball tournament at the 1980 Summer Olympics, in Moscow.

Brazil
The following volleyball players represented Brazil:
 Amauri
 Badalhoca
 Antônio Carlos Moreno
 Bernard
 Bernardinho
 Deraldo Wanderley
 Suíço
 João Graneiro
 Montanaro
 Xandó
 Renan
 William

Bulgaria
The following volleyball players represented Bulgaria:
 Stoyan Gunchev
 Khristo Stoyanov
 Dimitar Zlatanov
 Dimitar Dimitrov
 Tsano Tsanov
 Stefan Dimitrov
 Petko Petkov
 Mitko Todorov
 Kaspar Simeonov
 Emil Valchev
 Khristo Iliev
 Yordan Angelov

Cuba
The following volleyball players represented Cuba:
 Antonio Pérez
 Carlos Ruíz
 Carlos Salas
 Diego Lapera
 Ernesto Martínez
 Jorge Garbey
 José David Suárez
 Leonel Marshall Sr.
 Luis Oviedo
 Raúl Vilches
 Ricardo Leyva
 Víctor García

Czechoslovakia
The following volleyball players represented Czechoslovakia:
 Cyril Krejčí
 Igor Prieložný
 Ján Cifra
 Ján Repák
 Jaroslav Kopet
 Jaroslav Šmíd
 Josef Novotný
 Josef Pick
 Pavel Řeřábek
 Pavel Valach
 Vlado Sirvoň
 Vlastimil Lenert

Italy
The following volleyball players represented Italy:
 Antonio Bonini
 Claudio Di Coste
 Fabio Innocenti
 Fabrizio Nassi
 Francesco Dall'Olio
 Franco Bertoli
 Giancarlo Dametto
 Giovanni Lanfranco
 Giulio Belletti
 Mauro Di Bernardo
 Sebastiano Greco
 Stefano Sibani

Libya
The following volleyball players represented Libya:
 Ahmed Zoubi
 Awad Zakka
 Jamal Zarugh
 Kamaluddin Badi
 Miloud Zakka
 Mustafa El-Musbah
 Samid Sagar
 Adnan El-Khuja
 Ahmed El-Faghei

Poland
The following volleyball players represented Poland:
 Bogusław Kanicki
 Lech Łasko
 Leszek Molenda
 Maciej Jarosz
 Robert Malinowski
 Ryszard Bosek
 Tomasz Wójtowicz
 Wiesław Czaja
 Wiesław Gawłowski
 Włodzimierz Nalazek
 Wojciech Drzyzga

Romania
The following volleyball players represented Romania:
 Cornel Oros
 Laurenţiu Dumănoiu
 Dan Gîrleanu
 Nicu Stoian
 Sorin Macavei
 Constantin Sterea
 Nicolae Pop
 Günther Enescu
 Corneliu Chifu
 Marius Chiţiga

Soviet Union
The following volleyball players represented the Soviet Union:
 Yuriy Panchenko
 Vyacheslav Zaytsev
 Aleksandr Savin
 Vladimir Dorokhov
 Aleksandr Ermilov
 Pāvels Seļivanovs
 Oleh Molyboha
 Vladimir Kondra
 Vladimir Chernyshov
 Fedir Lashchonov
 Valeriy Kryvov
 Viljar Loor

Yugoslavia
The following volleyball players represented Yugoslavia:
 Vladimir Bogoevski
 Ivica Jelić
 Boro Jović
 Mladen Kašić
 Zdravko Kuljić
 Slobodan Lozančić
 Radovan Malević
 Miodrag Mitić
 Goran Srbinovski
 Aleksandar Tasevski
 Ljubomir Travica
 Vladimir Trifunović

References

1980